Lake Çavuşçu (also known as Lake Ilgın) is a fresh water lake in Turkey

The lake is fed by Battal and Çebişli creeks.

Fauna
The birds of the lake are the following: Moustached warbler, whiskered tern, black tern, common tern, stork, red-crested pochard, greylag goose.
Among the fishes of the lake cobitis turcica is an endemic species of Turkey.

References

Cavuscu
Cavuscu
Important Bird Areas of Turkey